Rânia is a 2012 Brazilian drama film directed by Roberta Marques. The film premiered in the official competition of the 2012 International Film Festival Rotterdam, and was the winner of the Première Brazil - "New Paths" in the 2011 Festival do Rio.

Plot
The film follows the story of Rânia, a young girl from Fortaleza, who spends the time on school, housework and working in a tent. Her biggest dream, however, is to become a dancer. With her best friend, Zizi, Rânia discovers the world of parties and orgies, and starts to make money with the nightlife. When Rânia meets the choreographer Estela, she finally have the chance to become a professional dancer, but will need to confront the intransigence of her parents.

Cast
 Rob Das as Belga
 Graziela Felix as Rânia
 Mariana Lima as Estela
 Nataly Rocha as Zizi
 Paulo José

References

External links
  
 

2011 films
Brazilian drama films
Films set in Fortaleza
Films shot in Fortaleza
2011 directorial debut films
2011 drama films